Lora Grigoryevna Yakovleva (also transliterated Jakovleva; born April 21, 1932 in Perm) is a Russian chess player who holds the ICCF title of Lady Grandmaster (LGM). She was the second ICCF Women's World Champion in correspondence chess between 1972 and 1977.

External links
 
 
 2. Fernschach-Olympiade der Frauen /  Ladies Correspondence Chess Olympiad 

1932 births
Living people
Soviet female chess players
Russian female chess players
World Correspondence Chess Champions
Sportspeople from Perm, Russia